"Big Area" is a song by English rock band Then Jerico, released in 1988 as the first single from their second album The Big Area. The song is their biggest hit and highest-charting single to date, reaching No. 13 on the UK Singles Chart in January 1989. It featured on the soundtrack to the 1989 film Slipstream.

Track listing
12" single
A. "Big Area" (12" Mix)
B1. "The Big Sweep" (Dance Mix)
B2. "The Motive" (USA Mix)

References

1988 songs
1988 singles
Then Jerico songs
London Records singles
Songs written by Mark Shaw (singer)
Song recordings produced by Gary Langan